The Winecoff House (also known as the Winecoff Hotel, Central Hotel or Carter Hall) is a U.S. historic building in Micanopy, Florida, at 102 Northeast Seminary Avenue.  It was added to the U.S. National Register of Historic Places in 2002.

It is a Greek Revival-style house build before 1871.

References

External links

Houses on the National Register of Historic Places in Florida
National Register of Historic Places in Alachua County, Florida
Houses in Alachua County, Florida